Andy Matthew (1932–1992) was a Scottish footballer who played in the successful East Fife post war team which enjoyed creditable league and cup success.

Matthew was selected once for Scotland in 1954 to play against The British Army. However The British Army v Scotland match in season 1953/54 is not regarded as an official international.

After retiring as a player, Matthew became a manager.

References

External links 
 

Cowdenbeath F.C. managers
Cowdenbeath F.C. players
Dunfermline Athletic F.C. players
East Fife F.C. players
Raith Rovers F.C. managers
Raith Rovers F.C. players
Rangers F.C. players
Scottish Football League players
Scottish football managers
Scottish footballers
1932 births
1992 deaths
Footballers from Kirkcaldy
Association football wingers
Scottish Football League managers
Scottish Football League representative players